Zheleznodorozhny (lit. railway (town); until 1946 ;), is an urban locality (an urban-type settlement) in Pravdinsky District of Kaliningrad Oblast, Russia. It is located 69 km (43 miles) south-east of Kaliningrad, near the border with Poland, and had a population in 2017 of 2,728.

History

A fortification of the Old Prussians existed in the Zheleznodorozhny area, possibly since the 9th century, however German settlers only arrived sometime in the late 13th or early 14th century. The settlers came in connection with the construction of a castle of the Teutonic Order, which is mentioned as completed in written sources from 1315 and 1325. A lischke was formed around the castle, and was attacked by Lithuanians in 1336, 1347 and 1366, but prospered and in 1398 received Kulm law (city status) by the Grand Master of the Teutonic Order Konrad von Jungingen. A town wall was erected in 1406, a school in 1409, and a Dominican monastery was also established in the town. In 1440, the town joined the anti-Teutonic Prussian Confederation, upon the request of which Polish King Casimir IV Jagiellon incorporated the region and town to the Kingdom of Poland in 1454. As a result, the Thirteen Years' War, the longest of all Polish–Teutonic wars, broke out, during which the local castle had been partially destroyed in battle in 1455. Following the war, in 1466, the region and town became part of Poland as a fief held by the Teutonic Knights. From 1469 the town was no longer under control of the Teutonic Order, but a fief of the von Schlieben family, who built a new castle for themselves in the town. The town was damaged from fire in 1485 after being burnt by Polish troops, and suffered further fires in 1585 and 1665. The castle of the Schlieben family was abandoned by 1672. In 1809 Gerdauen ceased to be a fief, and a railway connection to the town was established in 1871. From 1871, the town was part of Germany, within which it was located in the province of East Prussia. The ruins of the old castle served as the foundation for the construction of a residential building in 1874, with the large cellar of the castle incorporated into the new building.

Gerdauen was heavily damaged during fighting in World War I, but later rebuilt with monetary assistance from Wilmersdorf in Berlin, and the city of Budapest, Hungary. It prospered due to the malt processing industry and a large brewery, and in 1937 it had 5,152 inhabitants. During World War II, in 1944–1945, it was the location of Außenarbeitslager Gerdauen, a subcamp of the Stutthof concentration camp, in which the Germans imprisoned around 900 Jewish women and 100 Jewish men as forced labour. The town was damaged again during World War II. Following Germany's defeat in the war, the town initially passed to Poland, within which it was a county seat. It was then known under its historic Polish name Gierdawy. However, the town eventually was annexed by the Soviet Union. The German population was expelled and replaced with mostly Russian settlers, with the Soviet portion of the former province of East Prussia being organized into Kaliningrad Oblast. In 1946 the name was changed to its current name Zheleznodorozhny. After the collapse of the Soviet Union in 1991, Zheleznodorozhny became a part of the Russian Federation.

Demographics

Population

Ethnic composition
Russian  - 83.3%, 
Belarusians  - 6.3%,
Ukrainians  - 3.8%, 
Germans  - 2.3%, 
Armenians  - 2.1%, 
Poles  - 0.6%, 
Others - 1.6%

Notable people
 Theodor Gottlieb von Hippel the Elder (1741–1796), satirical writer
 Theodor Gottlieb von Hippel the Younger (1775–1837), jurist
 Wilhelm Steputat (1868-1941), author, jurist, politician
 Reinhold Rehs (1901 in Klinthenen – 1971) German politician and chairman of the Federation of Expellees in 1967-70 
 Hans Jenisch (1913–1982), U-boat commander
 Wolfgang Bernhard Jurkat (1929-2017), mathematician
 Hinrich Kuessner (born 1943), SPD-politician in Mecklenburg-Vorpommern

References

Urban-type settlements in Kaliningrad Oblast
Pravdinsky District